Gary Le Strange is a character created by comedian Waen Shepherd. Le Strange is played as an eccentric English cult-rock composer, songwriter and performer, who believes his surreal and abstract performances to be groundbreaking.

Le Strange's eclectic style of songs are bombastic, upbeat and quirky, in the new romantic style, and on stage he uses avant-garde performance art between songs.

Le Strange appeared at the 2003 Edinburgh Festival Fringe with his debut show Polaroid Suitcase, for which he received a Perrier award for Best Newcomer.

Gary Le Strange continues to perform live, and his most recent album is Beef Scarecrow.

TV credits
 Comedy Cuts, 2007

Theatre credits 
 Beef Scarecrow 2006
 Face Academy, 2004

Album releases 
 Polaroid Suitcase
 Face Academy
 Beef Scarecrow

References

External links 
 Gary Le Strange website
 More Info 

English male singers
English songwriters
English male comedians
20th-century English comedians
21st-century English comedians
British male songwriters